Texas Jeans USA is an American clothing company that manufactures denim and wildland firefighting clothing in Asheboro, North Carolina. A subsidiary of Fox Apparel, they are, "one of the last denim jean makers left that are 100% made in the USA."

The company's facility has been making products for more than 45 years. In 2007, the company employed approximately 150 people. By 2014, the company employed approximately 300 people at its 186,000 square foot manufacturing facility.

References

External links

1980s fashion
1990s fashion
2000s fashion
2010s fashion
2020s fashion
Clothing brands
Clothing brands of the United States
Jeans by brand